All the Dread Magnificence of Perversity is the fourth full-length studio album by Gnaw Their Tongues, released on May 10, 2009 by Burning World and Crucial Blast.

Critical reception 

Music journalist Ned Raggett wrote a mixed to positive review, describing the album as "dreadfully magnificent in its arrangements of sheer sonic overload, sculpted to be an opera-of-sorts in a black pit" and concluded that "it's a well-done, if off-putting, approach." Noel Gardner of The Quietus compared the music favorably to the bludgeoning sound of Khanate and Swans and said "the amount of ground Gnaw Their Tongues covers, while achieving a certain stubborn musical inertia, is truly impressive."

Track listing

Personnel
Adapted from the All the Dread Magnificence of Perversity liner notes.
 Maurice de Jong (as Mories) – vocals, instruments, recording, mixing, mastering, cover art

Release history

References

External links 
 
 All the Dread Magnificence of Perversity at Bandcamp

2009 albums
Gnaw Their Tongues albums